Alibeyköy S.K. is a Turkish sports club based in Alibeyköy quarter of Eyüp, Istanbul. It was founded in 1950 as Adaletspor with red-white colours. It changed its name as Alibeyköy Adalet in 1971 and its colours as orange-blue, and name as Alibeyköyspor in 1980. They played in Second League between 1980-1985. They are currently playing in the Turkish Regional Amateur League.

League participations
 Turkish Super League: 1959–60
 TFF First League: 1980–85
 TFF Second League: 1970–80, 1985–89, 1999–01, 2007–09
 TFF Third League: 2001–07, 2009–10, 2018-19
 Turkish Regional Amateur League: 2010–11, 2017-18, 2019-22
 Amateur Leagues: 1950-59, 1960–70, 1989–99, 2011–2017, 2022-

References

External links
Official website
Alibeyköyspor on TFF.org

Football clubs in Istanbul
Eyüp
Alibeyköyspor
1950 establishments in Turkey
Association football clubs established in 1950
Süper Lig clubs